The International Council of Unitarians and Universalists (ICUU) was an umbrella organization founded in 1995 comprising many Unitarian, Universalist, and Unitarian Universalist organizations. It was dissolved in 2021 along with the Unitarian Universalist Partner Church Council to make way for a new merged entity. Some groups represented only a few hundred people; while the largest, the Unitarian Universalist Association, had more than 160,000 members —including over 150,000 in the United States.

History
The original initiative for its establishment was contained in a resolution of the General Assembly of Unitarian and Free Christian Churches (British Unitarians) in 1987. This led to the establishment of the Advocates for the Establishment of an International Organization of Unitarians (AEIOU), which worked towards creating the council. However, the General Assembly resolution provided no funding.

The Unitarian Universalist Association (UUA) became particularly interested in the establishment of a council when it had to deal with an increasing number of applications for membership from congregations outside North America. It had already granted membership to congregations in Adelaide, Auckland, the Philippines and Pakistan, and congregations in Sydney, Russia and Spain had applied for membership. Rather than admit congregations from all over the world, the UUA hoped that they would join a world council instead. The UUA thus became willing to provide funding for the council's establishment.

As a result, the council was finally established at a meeting in Essex, Massachusetts, United States on 23–26 March 1995.

Principles and purposes
The Preamble to the Constitution of the International Council of Unitarians and Universalists reads:

We, the member groups of the International Council of Unitarians and Universalists, affirming our belief in religious community based on:

liberty of conscience and individual thought in matters of faith,
the inherent worth and dignity of every person.
justice and compassion in human relations,
responsible stewardship in human relations,
and our commitment to democratic principles,

declare our purposes to be:
to serve the Infinite Spirit of Life and the human community by strengthening the worldwide Unitarian and Universalist faith,
to affirm the variety and richness of our living traditions,
to facilitate mutual support among member organizations,
to promote our ideals and principles around the world,
to provide models of liberal religious response to the human condition which upholds our common values.

Members

Full members
Australian and New Zealand Unitarian Universalist Association (ANZUUA), 500 members
Brazilian Unitarian Association
Burundi Unitarian Church
Canadian Unitarian Council, 5,150
Czech Republic: Náboženská společnost českých unitářů (Religious Society of Czech Unitarians)
Denmark: Unitarisk Kirkesamfund, 55 families
European Unitarian Universalists, 120 members across Europe
Finland: Unitarian Universalist Society of Finland, 22 members
Germany: Unitarier - Religionsgemeinschaft freien Glaubens
Hungary: Unitarian Church of Hungary, 25,000 members
India: The Indian Council of Unitarian Churches, which includes the Khasi Unitarian Union, 9,000 members, and the Unitarian Christian Church of Madras, 225 members
Indonesia Global Church of God, around 200 members
Netherlands: Vrijzinnige Geloofsgemeenschap NPB, 4,385 members (2011), 60 congregations
Nigeria: First Unitarian Church of Nigeria and Ijo Isokan Gbogbo Eda (Unitarian Brotherhood Church)Defunct  
Norwegian Unitarian Church
Philippines: Unitarian Universalist Church of the Philippines founded 1954, 2000 members
Romania: Unitarian Church of Transylvania, 80,000 members
South Africa: Unitarian Church of South Africa, 110 members
Spain: Unitarian Universalist Society of Spain, 55 members
UK: General Assembly of Unitarian and Free Christian Churches, 6,000 members
USA: Unitarian Universalist Association (UUA), 162,796 (adult members)

Reorganizing
Kosciol Unitarianski (Unitarian Church in Poland), 80 attendees and friends.

Polish Unitarians have reported a need for a period of reorganization, and that at this time they are unable to maintain the level of activity needed to be full Council members, be it moved that membership of these groups be suspended. This action is taken with regret and the ICUU looks forward to welcoming Poland back into membership at the earliest possible date.

Provisional members
Churches and religious associations which have expressed their will to become members of the Council may be admitted as "Provisional Members" for a period of time (generally two or four years), until the Council decides that they have shown their organizational stability, affinity with the ICUU principles and commitment to deserve becoming Full Members of the Council. Provisional Members are invited to Council meetings through a delegate but cannot vote.

Kenyan Unitarians

Emerging groups
According to the Bylaws of the ICUU, Emerging Groups are "applicants that are deemed to be reasonable prospects for membership, but do not fulfil the conditions of either Provisional membership or Full Membership". These groups may be designated as Emerging Groups by the Executive Committee upon its sole discretion. Emerging Groups may be invited as observers to General Meetings.

The current list of Emerging Groups after the last meeting of the Executive Committee (London, 22–25 November 2008) is as follows:
Congo Unitarians
French Unitarians (Assemblée Fraternelle des Chrétiens Unitariens)
Unitarian Universalists Hong Kong—Hong Kong (China)
Italian Unitarians
Mexico (two groups: the Free Unitarian Congregation of Mexico, (LCUM) and the Unitarian Universalists of Mexico AC)

Associates
Organizations with beliefs and purposes closely akin to those of ICUU but which by nature of their constitution are not eligible for full membership or which do not wish to become full members now or in the foreseeable future, may become Associates of the ICUU. The application must be approved by the ICUU Council Meeting.

Unitarian or Universalist groups which are in contact but with no formal link to the ICUU
Peace and Harmony Center—Ushuaia, Argentina
Christian Unitarian Church of Argentina—Buenos Aires, Argentina
Bolivian Unitarians
Costa Rican Unitarians (apparently inactive)
Croatian Unitarian Universalists (UU Section of the Humanitas association)
Eglise Unitarienne de France
Berlin Unitarian Church (Germany)
Free Unitarian Fellowship, Frankfurt-am-Main (Germany)
Icelandic Unitarians within the National Church of Iceland
Doojin Christian Church (Japan)
Ruai/Tasia Unitarian Universalist Church in Kenya
UU Fellowship of Puerto Rico
Togo Unitarians

See also

United and uniting churches

References

External links
Official Website Of International Council of Unitarians and Universalists
Morrison, Mark D. (2016) "A Ménage á Trois: The UUA, GAUFCC and IARF and the Birth of the ICUU", an 89-page historical essay. Retrieved 15 January 2020

Christian organizations established in 1995
Supraorganizations
Unitarian Universalist organizations
United and uniting churches
International bodies of denominations